Eupithecia feliscaudata is a moth in the family Geometridae described by David Stephen Fletcher in 1956. It is found in Tanzania (it was described from Mount Kilimanjaro).

References

Moths described in 1956
feliscaudata
Moths of Africa